Field Marshal Henry Maitland Wilson, 1st Baron Wilson,  (5 September 1881 – 31 December 1964), also known as Jumbo Wilson, was a senior British Army officer of the 20th century. He saw active service in the Second Boer War and then during the First World War on the Somme and at Passchendaele. During the Second World War he served as General Officer Commanding-in-Chief (GOC-in-C) British Troops in Egypt, in which role he launched Operation Compass, attacking Italian forces with considerable success, in December 1940. He went on to be Military Governor of Cyrenaica in February 1941, commanding a Commonwealth expeditionary force to Greece in April 1941 and General Officer Commanding (GOC) British Forces in Palestine and Trans-Jordan in May 1941.

Wilson became GOC Ninth Army in Syria and Palestine in October 1941, GOC Persia and Iraq Command in August 1942 and GOC Middle East Command in February 1943. In the closing stages of the war he was Supreme Allied Commander in the Mediterranean, from January 1944, and then Chief of the British Joint Staff Mission in Washington D. C. from January 1945.

Early life and military service
Born in London, England, the son of Captain Arthur Maitland Wilson and his wife Harriet Wilson (née Kingscote), Wilson was educated at Eton College and Sandhurst. He was commissioned into the Rifle Brigade as a 2nd lieutenant on 10 March 1900. He served with the 2nd Battalion in South Africa in the Second Boer War, and having taken part in operations there in August 1900, was promoted to lieutenant on 18 March 1901. He served in South Africa throughout the war. Following the end of hostilities, he left Port Natal on the SS Malta in late September 1902, together with other officers and men of the 2nd battalion Rifle Brigade who were transferred to Egypt. He was posted with his battalion to Egypt and then in 1907 to India. Promoted to captain on 2 April 1908 he served with the 3rd Battalion at Bordon in Hampshire and then in Tipperary in Ireland, and in 1911 became Adjutant of the Oxford OTC.

Wilson served in the First World War, being appointed brigade major of the 48th Brigade on 15 October 1914; having been promoted to the rank of acting major in December 1914 and then to the substantive rank of major on 15 September 1915, he was sent to France to serve on the Western Front in December 1915. His capabilities as a staff officer led to him being moved to become General Staff Officer (GSO) 2 of the 41st Division on the Somme and of the XIX Corps at Passchendaele. In October 1917 he was appointed GSO 1 of the New Zealand Division with promotion to temporary lieutenant colonel on 28 October 1917. For his war service he was awarded the Distinguished Service Order in 1917 and was thrice mentioned in despatches.

After being promoted to brevet lieutenant colonel on 1 January 1919 and being hand-picked for the first post-war staff course at Camberley, Wilson was given command of a company of cadets at Sandhurst. He then became second-in-command of the 2nd Battalion, the Rifle Brigade at Aldershot in August 1923. Next he took command of his regiment's 1st Battalion on the North-West Frontier in January 1927, receiving promotion to the substantive rank of lieutenant colonel on 15 June 1927.

Returning to be an instructor at Camberley in June 1930, Wilson spent 9 months on half pay in 1933. Promoted to temporary brigadier, he became Commander of 6th Infantry Brigade in 1934 and having been promoted to major-general on 30 April 1935, he became General Officer Commanding 2nd Division in August 1937.

Second World War

Egypt (1939–1941)
On 15 June 1939, Wilson was appointed General Officer Commanding (GOC) of the British Troops in Egypt, with the rank of lieutenant-general, in which role he was also responsible for giving military advice for a range of countries from Abyssinia to the Persian Gulf. He made his HQ in Cairo and undertook successful negotiations with the Egyptian government at their summer quarters in Alexandria. The Treaty of 1936 called for the Egyptian army to fight under British command in the event of war and to supplement the limited force then at his disposal – an armoured division then being formed (later to be the 7th Armoured Division) and eight British battalions. He concentrated his defensive forces at Mersa Matruh some 100 miles from the border with Libya.

Early in August, Sir Archibald Wavell was appointed Commander-in-Chief of the Middle East Command, and he sent reinforcements which had been sought by Wilson, initially the 4th Indian Infantry Division and advanced elements of 6th Australian Division and, as the buildup at Mersa Matruh continued, Richard O'Connor and his staff at 7th Infantry Division in Palestine were moved to Egypt to reinforce Wilson's command structure there. O'Connor's HQ, initially designated British 6th Infantry Division, was activated in November and became responsible for the troops at Mersa Matruh. It was redesignated Western Desert Force in June 1940.

On 10 June 1940, Italian dictator Benito Mussolini declared war. Immediately Wilson's forces invaded Libya. However, their advance was reversed when on 17 June France sought an armistice and the Italians were able to move their forces from the Tunisian border in the West and reinforce with 4 divisions those that opposed Wilson in the East. Wilson was facing very superior forces. He had 31,000 troops to the Italians' 80,000, 120 tanks against 275, and 120 artillery pieces against 250. He realised that the situation was one where the traditional text books would not provide a solution. As with other 1940s commanders he had been well-schooled in strategy, and in thorough secrecy; he planned to disrupt the advance of the superior forces by attacking their extended lines at the right spots. After a conference with Anthony Eden and Wavell in October and rejecting Wavell's suggestion for a two-pronged attack, Wilson launched Operation Compass on 7 December 1940. The strategy was outstandingly successful and very quickly the Italian forces were cut in half.

While Operation Compass continued successfully in 1941 and resulted in the complete defeat of the Italian Army in North Africa, Wilson, who was already highly regarded by his First World War regimental colleague and now Secretary of State for War, Anthony Eden, had also won the confidence of Churchill himself. In a broadcast Churchill said, "General Wilson, who actually commands the Army of the Nile, was reputed to be one of our finest tacticians, and few will now deny him that quality."

Wilson was recalled to Cairo in February 1941 where he was offered and accepted the position of Military Governor of Cyrenaica.

Greece (April 1941)
Wilson was appointed to lead a Commonwealth expeditionary force ("W Force") of two infantry divisions and an armoured brigade to help Greece resist Italy and the subsequent German invasion in April 1941. Although the Allied forces were hopelessly inadequate Churchill's War Cabinet had thought it important to provide support for the only country outside the Commonwealth which was resisting the Axis advance. Wilson completed the evacuation of British troops from Greece on 29 April 1941. He was appointed a GBE on 4 March 1941 and promoted to full general on 31 May 1941.

Syria, Iraq and Palestine (1941–1943)

In May 1941, on his return from Greece, Wilson was appointed GOC British Forces in Palestine and Trans-Jordan and oversaw the successful Syria-Lebanon campaign, in which predominantly Australian, British, Indian, and Free French forces overcame Vichy French forces in fierce fighting. In July 1941 Churchill recommended Wilson to take command of the Western Desert Force to lead it in its upcoming offensive operation against the Afrika Korps, what would become Operation Crusader of November 1941, but General Sir Claude Auchinleck preferred instead Lieutenant-General Sir Alan Cunningham. In October 1941 Wilson took command of the Ninth Army in Syria and Palestine and was appointed to the honorary title of Aide-de-Camp General to the King.

Wilson enjoyed the confidence of Winston Churchill and he was Churchill's choice to succeed Auchinleck as commander of the Eighth Army in August 1942; however at the urging of the Chief of the Imperial General Staff, General Sir Alan Brooke, General Sir Bernard Montgomery was appointed to the post. Instead, Wilson was appointed to command the newly created independent Persia and Iraq Command on 21 August 1942. This command, which had been part of Middle East Command, was created when it appeared that Germany, following successes in southern Russia, might invade Persia (Iran).

C-in-C Middle East (1943)
In February 1943, after Montgomery's success at Alamein and the expulsion of Axis forces from North Africa, Wilson was appointed Commander-in-Chief of the Middle East. The Middle East was by this time comparatively removed from the main centres of fighting. However, on orders from London to create a diversion during the fighting in Italy, in September 1943 he organised an unsuccessful attempt to occupy the small Greek islands of Kos, Leros and Samos. The British forces suffered large losses to German air attacks and subsequent landings.

Supreme Allied Commander Mediterranean (1944)

Wilson succeeded Dwight D. "Ike" Eisenhower at Allied Forces Headquarters (AFHQ) as the Supreme Allied Commander in the Mediterranean on 8 January 1944 based at Algiers. As such he exercised strategic control over the campaign in Italy. He strongly advocated the invasion of Germany via the Danube plain, but this did not take place when the armies in Italy were weakened to support other theatres of war. Jumbo Wilson was keen to follow through with the deception plan Undercut, when unexpectedly the Germans decided to withdraw from Greece altogether. Although advised by Dudley Clarke that it might backfire and was unnecessary, Wilson was aware of the strategic complexities of the political situation. Every plan the General Staff had a shadow, integrated by 1944 with the American allies at all strategy levels; even to employ an actor imitating Monty arrive at Jumbo's HQ in Algiers.

Washington Mission (1945–1947)
In December 1944, following the death of Field Marshal Sir John Dill, Wilson was relieved as Supreme Commander, promoted to field marshal on 29 December 1944, and sent to Washington to be Chief of the British Joint Staff Mission, a post he took up in January 1945. One of Wilson's most secret duties was as the British military representative on the Combined Policy Committee which dealt with the development, production and testing of the atom bomb. Wilson continued to serve as head of the British Joint Staff Mission until 1947, to the satisfaction of Britain and the United States. President Truman awarded him the Distinguished Service Medal in November 1945.

Post-war
In January 1946 he was appointed aide-de-camp to George VI of the United Kingdom and was then created Baron Wilson, of Libya and of Stowlangtoft in the County of Suffolk. From 1955 to 1960 he was Constable of the Tower of London. Wilson had married Hester Wykeham (1890–1979) in 1914 and had one son and a daughter. The son, Lieutenant-Colonel Patrick Maitland Wilson, accompanied his father in the Middle East during the Second World War as an intelligence officer. The son's memoirs, Where the Nazis Came, provide anecdotes and descriptions of important events in his father's war service.  Never a rich man, when Field Marshal Lord Wilson died on 31 December 1964 in Chilton, Buckinghamshire, his estate was proved at only £2,952 (roughly £100,000 in 2013). His only son Patrick succeeded him in the barony.

References
Notes

Citations

Sources

Further reading
 
 
 
 
 
  published in

External links
British Army Officers 1939−1945
Generals of World War II

|-

|-

|-

|-

|-

|-

|-

|-

|-

|-

1881 births
1964 deaths
Military personnel from London
Graduates of the Royal Military College, Sandhurst
British Army personnel of the Second Boer War
British Army personnel of World War I
British field marshals of World War II
Companions of the Distinguished Service Order
Knights Grand Cross of the Order of the Bath
Knights Grand Cross of the Order of the British Empire
Commanders of the Legion of Merit
Recipients of the War Cross (Greece)
Recipients of the Silver Cross of the Virtuti Militari
Foreign recipients of the Distinguished Service Medal (United States)
People educated at Eton College
Rifle Brigade officers
Constables of the Tower of London
Graduates of the Staff College, Camberley
Recipients of the Distinguished Service Medal (US Army)
British military attachés
Barons created by George VI
Academics of the Royal Military College, Sandhurst
Academics of the Staff College, Camberley